Jackson 5: The Ultimate Collection is a compilation album released by Motown Records in 1995 featuring the music of The Jackson 5. The collection features selections from the group's Motown discography (recorded between 1969 and 1975), as well as a selection from group members Michael and Jermaine's solo output recorded during that time period, and is meant to serve as a condensed single-disc version of the 4-disc box set Soulsation! (1995). In the United Kingdom, a different track listing was used and was released as The Very Best of Michael Jackson with the Jackson Five, with a September 2001 re-release on Island Records titled The Best of Michael Jackson and the Jackson 5ive - The Motown Years.

Track listings
Tracks with an asterisk (*) are performed by Michael Jackson. "Daddy's Home" is performed by Jermaine Jackson backed by the Jackson 5.

Certifications

References

1995 greatest hits albums
Motown compilation albums
The Jackson 5 compilation albums